The 1918 Rhode Island gubernatorial election was held on November 5, 1918. Incumbent Republican Robert Livingston Beeckman defeated Democratic nominee Alberic A. Archambault with 53.11% of the vote.

General election

Candidates
Major party candidates
Robert Livingston Beeckman, Republican
Alberic A. Archambault, Democratic

Other candidates
Ernest Sherwood, Socialist

Results

References

1918
Rhode Island
Gubernatorial